VanaVani Matriculation Higher Secondary School, situated in the campus of the Indian Institute of Technology Madras in Chennai, Tamil Nadu, India was founded on 8 July 1963 as a primary school with 52 pupils. Today it has grown and developed into a full-fledged Matriculation Higher Secondary School with over 2,200 students.

Location
Located in what was originally a deer park of about .IIT is one of the greenest campuses in the city. The school is within easy reach by public transport from any part of the city. The institute offers transport service from the Main Gate and velachery Gate to the school for students residing outside the campus.

Administration
The school is run by the IIT Madras Educational Trust  and is managed by a Committee composed of the Chairman, Prof. S. P. Dhanavel, the Secretary-cum-Treasurer, Mr. Raman Kumar, the Principal, Mr. M. Sathish Kumar, an Educationist of Repute Smt. Vijayalakshmi Srivatsan and parent representatives.

On account of the close links the school has with IIT, the students of the school have several opportunities of participating in many of the social, cultural and scientific activities taking place in the campus.

Academics
The school prepares its students for the Tamil Nadu Matriculation Examination at the end of Standard X. However at XI and XII there is also a choice French. It also has a primary school for LKG & UKG and a newly built 'Creche'.

The school has been part of science and environmental educational programs sponsored by Sun Microsystems and Marriott Hotels and now the school has been rated as number 5 in the city.

VanFest
Vanfest or Vanavani Festival is a biennial inter-school event that takes place within the confines of IIT Madras. The event is hosted by the outgoing 12th grade students with assistance from the incoming 11th grade students. Students from 11th and 12th grades from all over Chennai are invited to attend this event. Vanfest used to be one of the highly anticipated festivals in the Chennai school circuit. Vanfest is usually held at the Student Activity Center (SAC) of IIT Madras. Students compete in various academic, cultural and social events for prizes.

Notable alumni
 Sundar Pichai
 Venky Harinarayan

References

External links
 
 

Indian Institute of Technology Madras
Primary schools in Tamil Nadu
High schools and secondary schools in Chennai
Educational institutions established in 1963
1963 establishments in Madras State